Sonora State Highway 155 (Carretera Estatal 155) is a highway in the south of the Mexican state of Sonora.

It runs from Sonora State Highway 147 east of San Ignacio Cohuirimpo to Sonora State Highway 176.

References

155